Letter Gap is an unincorporated community in Gilmer County, West Virginia, United States. Letter Gap had a post office, which closed on February 1, 1997.

References

Unincorporated communities in Gilmer County, West Virginia
Unincorporated communities in West Virginia